Bramley railway station may refer to:

Bramley railway station (Hampshire), in Bramley, Hampshire, England
Bramley railway station (West Yorkshire), in Leeds, England
Bramley & Wonersh railway station, disused station in Surrey